Xenosmilus hodsonae (from Greek, xenos, "strange" + , smilē, "chisel" ) is an extinct species of the Machairodontinae, or saber-toothed cats.

Description
The species name hodsonae originates from Debra Hodson, the wife of a researcher. Two fairly intact specimens were found by amateur fossil hunters in 1983 (1981 by some sources) in the Haile limestone mines in Alachua County, Florida. In 1994, the fossils were examined, and it was decided that the cats were of an entirely new genus. The fossils were of Irvingtonian age (1.8 to 0.3 Ma). Because the skeletons were found beside each other, some suspect Xenosmilus was a social mammal. Found alongside the two skeletons were dozens of peccary bones. It seems likely, with their muscular builds, that X. hodsonae preyed upon peccaries. 
 

Only Smilodon populator was noticeably larger amongst the saber-toothed cats. , its also been found in quarries dating to the end Blancan such as Inglis 1a and Haile 7g, dating it up to 2 million years ago.

Classification  
Xenosmilus is in the tribe Homotherini in the subfamily Machairodontinae of the cat family. A 2022 paper that reviewed the phylogeny of machairodonts in relation to a newly-described genus proposed that Xenosmilus was among the more derived members of the clade.

Xenosmilus is classified as a member of the Homotherini (sometimes referred to as Homotheriina), a tribe or subtribe of machairodonts. According to the 2022 study that suggests the subtribe hypothesis is correct while describing the transitional genus Taowu, Xenosmilus stands as a derived member of this subtribe, which is proposed to be nestled in the Machairodontini. This same study also suggests an increasing trend of robustness in more derived scimitar-toothed machairodonts, which may be a result of hunting slower, larger, and stronger types of prey.

Paleobiology
Before the discovery of Xenosmilus, all known saber-toothed cats fell into two general categories. Dirk toothed cats had long upper canines and stout legs. Scimitar toothed cats had only mildly elongated canines, and long legs. Xenosmilus broke these groupings by possessing both stout muscular legs and body, and short broad upper canines. Unlike most other saber-toothed cats, all of Xenosmilus's teeth were serrated, not just its fangs and incisors. The way its top teeth were lined up also allowed Xenosmilus to concentrate its bite force on two teeth at a time.   

Xenosmilus has also been theorized by some to have hunted via a "bite and retreat" strategy using its teeth to inflict deep wounds because of the way its canines and incisors could operate as a unit during a bite, leading to Xenosmilus bearing the occasional moniker of "cookie-cutter cat". Studies published in 2022 suggest that Xenosmilus and other machairodonts such as Smilodon were also capable of efficiently removing meat from a kill without damaging their teeth, as evidenced by bite marks on the bones of Platygonus. This same study also suggests that machairodonts could consume at least smaller bones when feeding, similar to lions.

References

Homotherini
Pleistocene genus extinctions
Prehistoric carnivoran genera
Pleistocene mammals of North America
Fossil taxa described in 2000